Diego de Humansoro Carantía, O.F.M. (1601–1676) was a Roman Catholic prelate who served as Bishop of Santiago de Chile (1660–1676).

Biography
Diego de Humansoro Carantía was born in Azcoitia, Spain in Nov 1601 and ordained a priest in the Order of Friars Minor.
On 26 Jan 1660, he was appointed during the papacy of Pope Alexander VII as Bishop of Santiago de Chile.
On 15 May 1662, he was consecrated bishop by Pedro de Villagómez Vivanco, Archbishop of Lima; and installed on 5 Jul 1662. 
He served as Bishop of Santiago de Chile until his death on 29 May 1676.

References 

17th-century Roman Catholic bishops in Chile
Bishops appointed by Pope Alexander VII
1601 births
1676 deaths
Franciscan bishops
Roman Catholic bishops of Santiago de Chile